Łowęcice  is a village in the administrative district of Gmina Jaraczewo, within Jarocin County, Greater Poland Voivodeship, in west-central Poland.

References

Villages in Jarocin County